Kyle Howard Rittenhouse (born January 3, 2003) is an American man who shot three men, two fatally, during the civil unrest in Kenosha, Wisconsin, in August 2020 when he was 17 years old. At his trial in November 2021, a jury found Rittenhouse not guilty of murder and all other charges after he testified that he acted in self-defense. 

Rittenhouse's prosecution attracted wide media coverage, and became a cause célèbre for right-wing organizations and media. Following his trial, he attended several events hosted by conservative organizations and individuals, including a meeting with former president Donald Trump, television features with political commentator Tucker Carlson, and guest appearances at several Turning Point USA productions. Rittenhouse's likeness has been used by fans to sell products, especially T-shirts. In 2022, he started a fundraising effort to sue media outlets in civil court for alleged defamation and announced a video game, Kyle Rittenhouse's Turkey Shoot, to raise funds for legal defense.

Early life and education 
Kyle Howard Rittenhouse was born on January 3, 2003, in Antioch, Illinois, to Michael and Wendy Rittenhouse. His parents were married in Lake County, Illinois, in February 2000, three years before his birth. He has two siblings, an older sister and a younger sister. His parents separated by 2014.

As a high school freshman, Rittenhouse participated in the Explorers program at the Grayslake Police Department, as well as a cadet program at the Antioch Fire Department, with the goal of becoming a paramedic or working in law enforcement. Eventually transitioning to online school, he dropped out and left Lakes Community High School altogether in 2018 after attending for one semester in 2017–2018. He expressed interest in law enforcement through publicly-viewable social media posts. In December 2018, Rittenhouse started a fundraiser through Facebook for Humanizing the Badge, a nonprofit. Other posts revolved around "honoring police, with Blue Lives Matter graphics, photos of officers killed in the line of duty, and the "thin blue line" flag associated with support for law enforcement." On his TikTok profile description, Rittenhouse had written, "BLUE LIVES MATTER 🔵" and "Trump 2020 🇺🇸 🇺🇸".

On January 30, 2020, Rittenhouse attended a Trump rally in Des Moines, Iowa, seated in the front row. He got a part-time job as a lifeguard at the YMCA in Lindenhurst, but was furloughed in March 2020 when the COVID-19 pandemic began.

Kenosha unrest shooting

On August 25, 2020, when he was 17, Rittenhouse shot three men during the civil unrest in Kenosha, Wisconsin that followed the shooting of a black man, Jacob Blake, by a police officer. Rittenhouse, a white American, was armed with an AR-15 style rifle and had joined a group of armed citizens in Kenosha who had said they were there to protect local businesses. After a man chased him into a parking lot and grabbed the barrel of his rifle, Rittenhouse fatally shot him. Rittenhouse fled and was pursued by a crowd. He then fatally shot a second man after the man struck Rittenhouse with a skateboard and tried to grab his rifle. Rittenhouse wounded a third when he was approached and had a handgun pointed at him.

At a criminal trial in Kenosha in November 2021, prosecutors argued that Rittenhouse was seen as an active shooter and had provoked the other participants while defense lawyers argued that he had acted in self-defense, stating that he had used force necessary to prevent imminent death or great bodily harm to himself. A jury weighed two counts of homicide, two counts of attempted homicide, and one count of reckless endangerment, and found Rittenhouse not guilty on all charges. Public sentiment and media coverage of the shootings was polarized and politicized, with an Economist/YouGov poll finding that two-thirds of Republicans thought Rittenhouse should be acquitted while three-quarters of Democrats thought he should be convicted. 

The family of one of the men who was fatally shot filed a civil suit against the police and county sheriff's departments in Kenosha in August 2021, and added Rittenhouse as a named defendant in January 2022.

Media appearances through July 2022
After the acquittal, Rittenhouse was sought for media appearances and attended a number of Republican and conservative events described as a public relations campaign and publicity tour. During the tour, he was represented by publicist Jillian Anderson, a former contestant on season 19 of the reality TV show The Bachelor. A picture of the two released on November 22, 2021, went viral on social media.

Tucker Carlson projects
A film crew for Tucker Carlson and Fox Nation followed Rittenhouse during the trial for a documentary feature, against the advice of Rittenhouse's attorneys.

Carlson of Fox News held an exclusive interview with Rittenhouse for Tucker Carlson Tonight immediately following his acquittal. Two days later on November 22, 2021, the hour-long episode titled "The Kyle Rittenhouse Interview" released, where Carlson interviewed him about a wide range of subjects. In the interview, Rittenhouse said he would eventually like to become a lawyer or nurse. He also said that he supported the Black Lives Matter movement and "peacefully demonstrating". Carlson introduced Rittenhouse as "bright, decent, sincere, dutiful, and hardworking... exactly the kind of person you would want many more of in your country." The episode was the second-most watched episode of the show's run since it premiered in 2016, following the episode on the 2021 U.S. Capitol attack earlier in 2021. It was watched by 4.942 million viewers (the show averages 3.16 million viewers) and had more than four times the viewers of any other network, leading TheWrap to state that the interview "crushed the rest of cable news" on the night it aired. Lorraine Ali of the Los Angeles Times said the interview "canonized" Rittenhouse while categorizing it as an overly sympathetic "soft ball" interview. Rittenhouse and Fox News both denied he was compensated in any way for the interview.

Meeting with President Trump
Former President Trump announced on Sean Hannity's show that Rittenhouse had requested a meeting, saying, "He called. He wanted to know if he could come over, say hello, because he was a fan." Rittenhouse, his mother, and Trump met at Mar-a-Lago, the same day the Tucker Carlson Tonight interview aired on November 22, 2021. Trump called him "really a nice young man," and the two were photographed together.

Turning Point USA events

Rittenhouse has appeared at several events run by Turning Point USA, a conservative nonprofit organization, including a panel called "Kenosha on Camera" at Turning Point USA's conservative youth conference AmericaFest in December 2021. Held on the third day of the conference on December 20, the panel consisted of Rittenhouse, Charlie Kirk, Jack Posobiec, Elijah Schaffer, and Drew Hernandez. During the panel, Rittenhouse said, "I think my trial was an example of them trying to come after our Second Amendment rights, our right to defend ourselves and trying to take our weapons." Kirk described him as a "hero to millions," and the crowd gave him a standing ovation after chanting his name. The organization arranging the event said Rittenhouse was not compensated for the 45-minute panel appearance.

Rittenhouse also appeared onstage at a Turning Point Young Women's Leadership Summit in 2022, introduced as "the kind of man you should want to be attracted to" who would "protect [his] family" and "stand strong in the face of opposition from culture and evil".

Podcasts
Rittenhouse has been a guest on several podcasts, including the Blaze Media project You Are Here, hosted by Elijah Schaffer and Sydney Watson, where Rittenhouse said going to protests was "not the best idea". He also appeared on The Jenna Ellis Show, hosted by former Trump staffer Jenna Ellis. On that show, he expressed fear of harassment and said he was afraid to run errands. He denied being a racist, domestic terrorist, or white supremacist, saying he had been attacked by those who described him in these terms. Rittenhouse also said he had reached out to President Joe Biden several times but had not received a response, adding, "He still hasn't replied. So it just shows how much of a man he is to not sit down and talk."

Commercialization and use of his image
While campaigning for president in 2020, Biden used images of Rittenhouse in a campaign video he tweeted the day after the September 29 presidential debate. The BBC wrote the video "appeared to link Rittenhouse, without any evidence, to white supremacists." Rittenhouse said using his image and linking him to white supremacy was "actual malice, defaming my character, for him to say something like that." Charles Homans, writing for the New York Times, reported that Rittenhouse was adopted as an informal mascot of the Proud Boys and was photographed surrounded by members of the group after he was released on bond. 

Right-wing memes using Rittenhouse's image have spread on social media. In a study of his image being used as a meme on Twitter, the  Global Network on Extremism and Technology found thousands of instances of Rittenhouse's face and commentary on his actions shared through a variety of different hashtags. Multiple political figures have shared those memes, including Donald Trump Jr. and Barry Moore. In March 2022, Rittenhouse shared a meme of himself crying while on the witness stand during his trial to protest rising gas prices, which he tweeted was "thanks to a Joe Biden presidency".

Rittenhouse's image has been used for a number of products and sales, including clothing, a gun sale, and a video game. Fans of Rittenhouse have continued to sell clothing with his image following the trial. In 2020, YouTube was criticized for a lack of adequate content moderation – arbitrarily allowing videos depicting Rittenhouse which glorified violence and monetized the killings through links to merchandise – until it was pointed out by a BBC journalist.

The week following Rittenhouse's acquittal, the Saddle River Range gun store in Conroe, Texas held a "not guilty" sale and the owner posted a photo of Rittenhouse with a gun on their Instagram page.

The same week, speculation on a book deal began. Attorney Andrew M. Stroth, who previously worked as a talent agent, said Rittenhouse could "easily" get a book contract over $1 million. In January 2022, Rittenhouse spokesman David Hancock said Rittenhouse was considering writing a book chronicling his "unorthodox journey into adulthood". He further said the discussions were in the "early phase".

Video games
In March 2022, Swedish company Nordic Empire Games launched a video game featuring Rittenhouse called Acquitted. Described as a far-right extremist group owned by William Hahne, the organization created the game that features Rittenhouse shooting his way through crowds of zombies with the choice of 18 different weapons. It was launched through the Steam hosting platform and available for $5. It was not announced if Nordic Empire Games had sought permission to use Rittenhouse's image. 

On June 23, 2022, Rittenhouse announced a video game called Kyle Rittenhouse's Turkey Shoot, developed by Mint Studios, for the purpose of funding his media defamation suits. The video game, which features a cartoon Rittenhouse holding a bright orange gun with the aim of shooting turkeys that represent the media, has no stated release date. In a social media advertisement for the game, Rittenhouse described the media as "nothing but a bunch of turkeys with nothing better to do than to push their lying agenda and destroy innocent people's lives."

Political internship offers, namesake bills, and politics
Rittenhouse has been publicly offered multiple internships, all by Republican lawmakers. On November 17, 2021, two days before the jury's decision, Florida House Representative Matt Gaetz offered him an internship. In response, Arizona House Representative Paul Gosar tweeted he would arm-wrestle Gaetz for the chance to have Rittenhouse as an intern. On the day the jury found Rittenhouse not guilty on all charges, North Carolina House Representative Madison Cawthorn offered Rittenhouse an internship. During an appearance on Newsmax, Colorado House Representative Lauren Boebert responded to Cawthorn's offer and challenged Cawthorn, who is bound to a wheelchair, to "a sprint" to employ Rittenhouse as an intern. In response to Gaetz, Gosar, and Cawthorn offering the internships, Missouri House representative Cori Bush called for their expulsion, tweeting "Not only do these members fuel violence. Now they're actively recruiting someone whose sole qualification is killing people standing up for Black lives and getting away with it."

At least two laws, a bill, and a proclamation have been proposed in different states which have been named after Rittenhouse. In November 2021, U.S. House representative from Georgia Marjorie Taylor Greene introduced the Kyle H. Rittenhouse Congressional Gold Medal Act (H.R.6070) during the 117th United States Congress. The bill, which would award Rittenhouse the Congressional Gold Medal, had no co-sponsors. Taylor Greene said, "Kyle Rittenhouse deserves to be remembered as a hero who defended his community, protected businesses, and acted lawfully in the face of lawlessness. I'm proud to file this legislation to award Kyle Rittenhouse a Congressional Gold Medal."

In November 2021, Oklahoma Senate Representative Nathan Dahm introduced Senate Bill 1120, called "Kyle's Law". The bill states if a defendant is charged with murder, but is found not guilty due to justifiable homicide, the state must reimburse them. A modified version of the bill passed out of the Senate Judiciary Committee with a majority Republican party-line 7–3 vote in February 2022. 

In January 2022, Tennessee State Representative Bruce Griffey introduced HB1769, also known as "Kyle's Law". The Hill said the law "would require the state to reimburse defendants found not guilty of homicide charges due to self-defense." Griffey additionally proposed a proclamation be created in honor of Rittenhouse, saying he "deserves to be recognized as a hero."

In November 2022, Rittenhouse met with Republican House of Representative members of the Second Amendment Caucus to discuss his experiences and answer questions from the caucus. The meeting was held at the Conservative Partnership Institute in Washington D.C. Caucus members who were present included Reps. Lauren Boebert (R-CO),  Thomas Massie (R-KY), Andrew Clyde (R-GA) and Byron Donalds (R-FL). Rittenhouse said, "I'm 19 and just got to speak with leaders of the greatest country on earth! This was an amazing evening where I got to share my story and discuss the importance of the Second Amendment. Even while the radical left continues to sue me and disparage my name, I know these great leaders have my back." Rittenhouse has become a gun rights advocate since his trial.

In January 2023, a Texas brewery cancelled an anti-censorship rally it was to host featuring Rittenhouse, citing concerns by local patrons and a conflict with its own values. In response, Rittenhouse accused the brewery of censoring him.

Media projects

Media Accountability Project 
In February 2022, Rittenhouse announced he was launching the Media Accountability Project, sometimes referred to by its acronym TMAP, during another interview on Tucker Carlson Tonight, saying:

Rittenhouse's announcement drew a comparison by The Tennessee Star to Nicholas Sandmann, a Covington Catholic High School student from Kentucky who became known for the January 2019 Lincoln Memorial confrontation. 

In 2022, a satirical story turned into a rumor circulating on social media saying that Rittenhouse had filed and settled a lawsuit against Whoopi Goldberg and The View. The story was false.

YouTube channel
Rittenhouse launched a YouTube channel focusing on guns and the Second Amendment on October 16, 2022. His first video on the channel showed him firing a handgun and an automatic rifle and included the YouTube gun advocate Brandon Herrera as a guest.

Personal life

Educational aspirations
In October 2021, Rittenhouse started taking online classes at Arizona State University as a non-degree seeking student, and wanted to transition to in-person classes. Non-degree seeking students at ASU go through a "modified admissions process" instead of the full admissions process for degree-seeking students. ASU students held a rally called "Killer off campus" to protest Rittenhouse's enrollment. Multiple student groups organized the rally, including: Students for Justice in Palestine, Students for Socialism, ASU's MEChA chapter, and the Multicultural Solidarity Coalition. By the next month, he had withdrawn. 

In a June 2022 appearance on The Charlie Kirk Show, Rittenhouse said he would be attending Texas A&M University in College Station, Texas; a spokesperson from the university denied he had been accepted. After that announcement, Rittenhouse posted on Twitter he would be attending Blinn College, a junior college and what he referred to as a "feeder school" for Texas A&M. A Blinn College spokesperson confirmed Rittenhouse had applied, but had "not enrolled for a current or upcoming term."

Notes

References

External links 

 

2003 births
Living people
21st-century American people
American media personalities
People acquitted of murder
People from Antioch, Illinois
Shooting of Jacob Blake